Craig Shoemaker (born November 15, 1964) has had a career in show business, spanning over four decades as a stand up comedian, actor, author, writer and producer. He was named Comedian of the Year at The American Comedy Awards on ABC and garnered two NATAS Emmy awards. His 90-minute stand-up special, Daditude, aired prime time on SHOWTIME Network and was on the front page on Netflix for several months.

Life and career
Craig grew up in the Philadelphia area and graduated from Springfield Township High School.[1] He attended Temple University, financing his college years by working as a bartender and MC for comedy shows. He also attended California University of Pennsylvania. Shoemaker received a Bachelor of Arts degree with majors in Radio, television and film.

"Shoe's" stage, film and TV acting credits are extensive and wide ranging. Recently, he co-stars as Bandit in the critically acclaimed movie, Middle Man. He recurred as the character Wilson Gromling, the head of Pawnee's Liberty or Die Party, on NBC's Parks & Recreation, and had a five episode run on The Bold & The Beautiful. He also played the film professor in horror sequel, Scream 2. As a writer, Craig was called in to join the writing staff for season two of the iconic sitcom Fuller House. His best selling book, LoveMaster'd A Digital Journey to Love & Happiness, is critically acclaimed by the likes of Whoopi Goldberg and Dr. Drew Pinsky, inspiring readers worldwide in managing through personal difficulties.

In 2003, he founded LaughterHeals.org, a nonprofit group dedicated to using laughter as a healing modality. Previously, Shoemaker hosted a weekly podcast & webcast, "Laugh It Off," and currently tours the world speaking about the healing powers of laughter. Currently they are in preproduction on the documentary, Live 2 Laugh, with Shoemaker serving as producer and writer. 

As a producer, Craig has been a creative force in several independent features and television shows. He wrote, produced and starred in the cult classic Totally Baked and his movie The LoveMaster, won the Los Angeles Independent Film Festival. Currently Craig is producing a number of feature films in association with European partners, including the soon-to-be-released, Working with Warhol, and two projects in production, Breakfast with Charly and The Boogeyman Chronicles. He was hired as lead writer on the animated show, Bad Zoo, and along with animator David Feiss is developing two other cartoons, From The Crib and ChickenShip. He is also performing stand up with Bill Bellamy on their joint project, the "Make America Laugh Again Tour," and just started the production company Really Big Shoe Media, with a current slate of over 25 television and film projects in varying genres.

Personal life
Shoemaker was married to actress Carolyn Ann Clark, and had two sons with her, Justin (b. 1998) and Jared (b. 2004), though they later divorced.  He is currently married to Mika Shoemaker, with whom he has a son Jackson (b. 2009) and daughter Chloe (b. 2014).

In 2012 he received an honorary doctorate in Humanities/Humanistic Studies from California University of Pennsylvania.

Film

Selected television

Awards

Books
 Shoemaker, Craig; Kushner, Sarah (illustrator); Novak, Robert; Bennett, Marc (2002). What You Have Now ... What Your Daddy Had Then. Bennett/Novak and Company, Inc. 
 Shoemaker, Craig; Kushner, Sarah (illustrator) (2004). What You Have Now ... What Your Mommy Had Then. Bennett/Novak and Company, Inc.

References

External links
 
 Laughter Heals charity
 Craig Shoemaker IG
 Craig Shoemaker Facebook
 CraigShoemaker.com
 Craig Shoemaker's Podcast website

1964 births
Living people
American game show hosts
American male comedians
American male film actors
American impressionists (entertainers)
American male television actors
American male voice actors
People from Montgomery County, Pennsylvania
Male actors from Philadelphia
20th-century American comedians
21st-century American comedians